Arnold Jules Élie Badjou (25 June 1909 – 17 September 1994) was a Belgian football goalkeeper.

He played his entire career (1929–1938) at Daring. He was in the Belgium national football team squads in 1930, 1934 and 1938 FIFA World Cups and played 3 matches in the 1930 and 1938 editions. Badjou was the last surviving member of Belgium's 1930 World Cup squad.

References

Footbel.be statistics
FIFA profile

External links
 
 

1909 births
1994 deaths
Belgian footballers
Belgium international footballers
Association football goalkeepers
R. Daring Club Molenbeek players
1930 FIFA World Cup players
1934 FIFA World Cup players
1938 FIFA World Cup players
Footballers from Brussels